The Braniff Building is a historic 10-story office building in Oklahoma City, Oklahoma. It was designed by Solomon Andrew Layton and built in 1923. It was the first office for Braniff Airlines and is located at 324 North Robinson Street.  It is listed on the National Register of Historic Places (NRHP #80003281).

The Braniff Building was purchased by Kerr-McGee Oil Company in 1964 and signage for Braniff removed. It was damaged by the bombing of the  Alfred P. Murrah Federal Building in 1995.  It sat empty for 30 years before it was purchased and renovated by SandRidge Energy. The building sold for $15.9 million in 2016. It is home to restaurant Kitchen No. 324 and the law firm Crowe Dunlevy.

References

Braniff
National Register of Historic Places in Oklahoma City
Oklahoma City bombing
1923 establishments in Oklahoma
Office buildings completed in 1923